, born  is a Japanese comedian, impressionist, and television host. His hosting credits include Gilgamesh LIGHT, a revival of the 90s show Gilgamesh Night, and the Nogizaka46 variety show NogiBingo!

Okada is represented by Horipro. He was married in 2016 in  Hawaii.

Filmography

TV series

Current appearances

Former appearances

Films

Radio series

TV dramas

Anime

Music videos

References

External links
 

Japanese impressionists (entertainers)
1964 births
Living people
Male actors from Tokyo
Comedians from Tokyo
Japanese male film actors
20th-century Japanese male actors
21st-century Japanese male actors